FOX (forkhead box) proteins are a family of transcription factors that play important roles in regulating the expression of genes involved in cell growth, proliferation, differentiation, and longevity. Many FOX proteins are important to embryonic development. FOX proteins also have pioneering transcription activity by being able to bind condensed chromatin during cell differentiation processes.

The defining feature of FOX proteins is the forkhead box, a sequence of 80 to 100 amino acids forming a motif that binds to DNA. This forkhead motif is also known as the winged helix, due to the butterfly-like appearance of the loops in the protein structure of the domain. Forkhead proteins are a subgroup of the helix-turn-helix class of proteins.

Biological roles

Many genes encoding FOX proteins have been identified. For example, the FOXF2 gene encodes forkhead box F2, one of many human homologues of the Drosophila melanogaster transcription factor forkhead. FOXF2 is expressed in the lung and placenta.

Some FOX genes are downstream targets of the hedgehog signaling pathway, which plays a role in the development of basal cell carcinomas. Members of class O (FOXO- proteins) regulate metabolism, cellular proliferation, stress tolerance and possibly lifespan. The activity of FoxO is controlled by post-translational modifications, including phosphorylation, acetylation and ubiquitination.

Discovery
The founding member and namesake of the FOX family is the fork head transcription factor in Drosophila, discovered by German biologists Detlef Weigel and Herbert Jäckle. Since then a large number of family members have been discovered, especially in vertebrates. Originally, they were given vastly different names (such as HFH, FREAC, and fkh), but in 2000 a unified nomenclature was introduced that grouped the FOX proteins into subclasses (FOXA-FOXS) based on sequence conservation.

Genes
 FOXA1, FOXA2, FOXA3 (See also Hepatocyte nuclear factors.)
 FOXB1, FOXB2
 FOXC1 (associated with glaucoma), FOXC2 (varicose veins)
 FOXD1, FOXD2, FOXD3 (vitiligo), FOXD4, FOXD4L1, FOXD4L3, FOXD4L4, FOXD4L5, FOXD4L6
 FOXE1 (thyroid), FOXE3 (lens)
 FOXF1 (lung), FOXF2
 FOXG1 (brain)
 FOXH1 (widely expressed)
 FOXI1 (ear), FOXI2, FOXI3
 FOXJ1 (cilia), FOXJ2 (erythroid), FOXJ3
 FOXK1, FOXK2 (HIV, IL-2, adrenal)
 FOXL1 (ovary), FOXL2
 FOXM1 (cell cycle, erythroid, cancer)
 FOXN1 (hair, thymus), FOXN2, FOXN3 (cell cycle checkpoints; widely expressed), FOXN4
 FOXO1 (widely expressed: muscle, liver, pancreas), FOXO3 (apoptosis, erythroid, longevity), FOXO4 (widely expressed), FOXO6 (liver, skeletal muscle, brain)
 FOXP1 (pluripotency then brain, heart and lung), FOXP2 (widely expressed? brain; language), FOXP3 (T cells), FOXP4 – may be ancestrally responsible for motor learning, based on insect studies (where there's only one FoxP)
 FOXQ1
 FOXR1, FOXR2
 FOXS1

Cancer
A member of the FOX family, FOXD2, has been detected progressively overexpressed in human-papillomavirus-positive neoplastic keratinocytes derived from uterine cervical preneoplastic lesions at different levels of malignancy. For this reason, this gene is likely to be associated with tumorigenesis and may be a potential prognostic marker for uterine cervical preneoplastic lesions progression.

References

External links
 

Aging-related proteins